The Great Dunhuang is a Chinese television series based on the history of the oasis city of Dunhuang, which lies on the ancient Silk Road. With a Buddhist sutra printed in gold lettering as the plot device, the series retells the rise, fall and rebirth of Dunhuang in three parts, each covering a different period in Chinese history: the Western Xia, the late Qing dynasty, and the Republican era. The series was first broadcast in mainland China on CCTV from 31 October – 25 November 2006.

Plot
The original version did not have titles for the 3 parts. The Japanese DVD version, however, gave the following titles: Part One, Part Two, and Part Three, .

Part One (episodes 1–12)
Part One is set in the Jingyou era (1034–1038) of the reign of Emperor Renzong in the Song dynasty. The Kingdom of Khotan is conquered by the Kara-Khanid Khanate. Meiduo, a Khotan princess, flees to Dunhuang to join her elder sister, Zhenniang. Along the way, she meets Li Yuanhao, the ambitious Western Xia ruler who desires to dominate the western regions of China. Li, who has been eyeing Dunhuang for a long time, plans to make use of the princess to seize control of the city. He sends his general Wangrong to escort Meiduo to Dunhuang and pass a message to Cao Shunde, the governor of Dunhuang. Li asks Cao for permission to allow his army to pass through Dunhuang, so that he can help Meiduo take revenge by attacking the Kara-Khanid Khanate. Li is actually plotting to take over Dunhuang once his army enters the city.

Li Yuanhao and Cao Shunde used to be rivals a decade ago because both of them fell in love with the same woman, Zhenniang, who eventually married Cao. Cao senses Li's ill intentions so he secretly sends a messenger to the Song imperial court to ask for reinforcements. However, the Song government is occupied with a war against the Liao dynasty, so they despatched Fang Tianyou, an artist from the Hanlin Academy, to resolve the crisis. Fang brings with him a Buddhist sutra printed in gold lettering, in the hope that the presence of the sutra in Dunhuang will increase the sanctity of the city and make Li Yuanhao think twice about invasion.

In Dunhuang, Fang Tianyou meets Meiduo and they fall in love with each other on first sight. However, Wangrong also has feelings for Meiduo and he uses his lord's name to coerce Cao Shunde to agree to let him marry Meiduo. Concurrently, Li Yuanhao requests to borrow the Buddhist sutra for a few days but is rejected by Cao Shunde. Li then sends his forces to occupy Guazhou, a strategic town in Dunhuang, and says that Guazhou will be the bride price for the marriage between Wangrong and Meiduo.

Cao Shunde and Fang Tianyou discuss plans to counter Li Yuanhao's aggressive advances. Fang proposes forming alliances with other kingdoms in the region against Western Xia. However, their offers are rejected by those kings, who fear Western Xia's military might, and Dunhuang becomes even more isolated. Eventually, it is clear that the only way to ensure peace between Dunhuang and Western Xia is for Meiduo to marry Wangrong. However, on her wedding night, Meiduo escapes and goes to find Fang Tianyou. Wangrong is angered when Meiduo is nowhere to be found and he leads an army to attack Dunhuang. Cao Shunde's subordinates are already very displeased with their master for not resisting Li Yuanhao, so they turn against him and kill him in the ensuing battle. Dunhuang ultimately falls to Western Xia. Zhenniang commits suicide by throwing herself into a fire after making Li Yuanhao promise her that he will not massacre Dunhuang's citizens.

Wangrong's search for Meiduo leads him to the Mogao Caves, where he starts ravaging the sacred grounds and slaughtering innocents. Meiduo realises that there is no escape and she leaps off a cliff to prevent Wangrong from harming Fang Tianyou. Fang wanders around aimlessly in the vast desert, holding a piece of the Buddhist sutra. He encounters a sandstorm. When the dust clears, only the sutra is left. In the far distance, an insane Wangrong is seen riding towards the horizon, tightly hugging Meiduo's dead body in his arms.

Part Two (episodes 13–30)
Part Two is set in the late Qing dynasty. Qin Wenming, an official from the Ministry of Works, is commissioned by the imperial court to find jade in Dunhuang. He disappears mysteriously and leaves behind no traces. His lover, Chunxia, suffers from depression and turns insane.

Qin Wenming's twin brother, Qin Wenyu, travels to Dunhuang in search of his brother but finds himself caught in a deceptive plot. He is determined to unravel the mystery behind his brother's disappearance and decides to remain there. At the same time, he relies on Yan, the magistrate of Dunhuang, for help. He also befriends a camel trader named Feng Dagang, a craftsman called Wang Youxiang, and Wang's daughter Xinghua. He encounters a female bandit chief, Honglian, and his brother's lover Chunxia, who recovers from her mental illness after mistaking him for Qin Wenming. With assistance from his friends and companions, Qin Wenyu makes a startling discovery that the clue to his brother's disappearance lies in a piece of a Buddhist sutra his brother left behind for him. Qin Wenyu concludes that the Buddhist sutra is an ancient artefact from Dunhuang and strongly believes that there is something hidden in the oasis city.

In the meantime, two British explorers, Baker and John, arrive in Dunhuang to hunt for treasure. Magistrate Yan denies them permission to carry out their activities. An earthquake occurs and the Buddhist manuscripts concealed in the Mogao Caves are revealed. The greedy Priest Wang allows Baker and John to steal the manuscripts, which are regarded as national treasure, and escape from Dunhuang. Qin Wenyu is steadfast in his belief that the manuscripts be retrieved so he urges Magistrate Yan to send his men to arrest the thieves. Just then, they receive news that the armies of the Eight-Nation Alliance have occupied Beijing, and the Qing government has agreed to peace talks. Yan immediately turns friendly towards the British explorers and even agrees to allow them to leave with the treasure.

Qin Wenyu is disappointed with the magistrate's decision and decides to take matters into his own hands. While bringing his friends with him in pursuit of Baker and John, they fall into an ambush laid by Magistrate Yan and his men. Yan intends to capture Honglian and claim the bounty on her head, but Chunxia sacrifices herself to save Honglian. Qin Wenyu, Honglian, Feng Dagang and their companions are shot to death by the magistrate's men. The national treasure from Dunhuang falls into the hands of Baker and John.

Part Three (episodes 31–46)
Part Three is set in 1936, during the Republican era just before the outbreak of the Second Sino-Japanese War. Liang Moyan, a painter, and his wife Su Qingping, a sculptor, want to fulfil their dream of restoring the ancient city of Dunhuang. However, their task is not going to be easy, as there are various opposing factors at hand: Dunhuang is in ruins due to a long history of tomb raiding and desecration; the couple run into trouble with bandits; the local residents are indifferent towards the idea of reviving Dunhuang; foreigners have also set their sights on the city; the government is inept and keeps shoving responsibilities around.

Liang Moyan and Su Qingping are unwilling to give up on their quest and they start preserving artefacts and rebuilding Dunhuang. With their sheer determination and sincerity, they move many people and even succeed in influencing younger generations to continue their work. However, the couple also sacrifice themselves in their fight against grave robbers and plunderers.

Chiba Sanrō, a young artist from Japan who has a fervent interest in Dunhuang, travels to the oasis city. He has received a secret order from the Japanese military to find the Buddhist sutra printed in gold lettering. Despite his fiery passion for art, he was strongly influenced by militarism in his homeland, so he harbours prejudiced views against the Chinese people. During his encounters with Liang Moyan and Su Qingping, his soul experiences an unprecedented shock and baptism. The personal struggles and reflections he went through eventually prompt him to overcome his hostility towards the Chinese and make a fresh start in life.

The stories of Liang Moyan, Su Qingping and Chiba Sanrō tell us that Dunhuang's heritage truly belongs to those who know how to appreciate and preserve it.

Cast

Part One
 Tang Guoqiang as Li Yuanhao, the ruler of Western Xia.
 Chen Hao as Meiduo, a princess from the Kingdom of Khotan.
 Huang Haibing as Fang Tianyou, a Song artist from the Hanlin Academy.
 Ren Tianye as Wangrong, a Western Xia general.
 Liao Jingsheng as Cao Shunde, the governor of Dunhuang.
 Deng Ying as Zhenniang, Cao Shunde's wife and Meiduo's elder sister.
 Zhang Guangzheng as Wuchen, a Song priest.
 Liu Dagang as Ashena, from the Dian Kingdom.
 Lu Yong as Zhang Yingshou, a Dunhuang general.
 Xue Haowen as Luo Zan, a general.

Part Two
 Wan Hongjie as Qin Wenyu, a Qing official and scholar.
 Tao Feifei as Chunxia, a virtuous woman.
 Shang Tiantong as Honglian, a female bandit chief.
 Gao Lancun as Magistrate Yan, an official in charge of Dunhuang.
 Shi Xiaoman as Jiang Xiaoci, the boss of the Fulong Company.
 Su Tingshi as Priest Wang
 Li Zhi as Liu Dakui, a bandit.
 Dania as John, a British tomb raider.
 Mohammed as Baker, a British tomb raider.
 Luo Xuwu as Feng Dagang, a camel trader.
 Wei Deshan as Wang Youxiang, a craftsman.
 Chen Baojia as Master Zhao, a Qing merchant.
 Wu Jiayi as Ma Quande, a camel trader.
 Hu Xiaoting as Xinghua, Wang Youxiang's daughter.
 Sun Di as Choudan, a young camel trader.
 Wang Xuanyin as Shuimei, a female bandit.
 Zhang Tielin (guest star) as a Qing governor

Part Three
 Wei Zi as Liang Moyan, a painter.
 Li Jianqun as Su Qingping, Liang Moyan's wife and a sculptor.
 Xia Fan as Chiba Sanrō, a young Japanese artist.
 Yvonne Yung as Hongliu, a female bandit from the northwest.
 Wang Huichun as Chen Yizhong, an antique trader.
 Zhang Qiuge as Dou Heizi, a bandit chief.
 Lu Jun as Lu Jingru, the mayor of Dunhuang.
 Wang Jun as Takeno, a Japanese warrior.
 Chang Chuan as Tang Liancheng, a housekeeper.
 Liu Peiqing as He Fugui, the master of an opera troupe.
 Liu Sha as Li Yaqin, a young artist.
 Ma Jing as Yanzi, a young woman interested in the culture of Dunhuang.
 Wang Lanwu as Sun Shichang, an innkeeper.
 Ding Haifeng (guest star) as Miyamoto, a Japanese general.

References

External links
  The Great Dunhuang on Sina.com

2006 Chinese television series debuts
2006 Chinese television series endings
Television series set in the Northern Song
Television series set in the Qing dynasty
Dunhuang
Television series set in the Western Xia
Mandarin-language television shows
China Central Television original programming
Chinese historical television series
Television shows set in Gansu